

Delivery

Satellite
 Sky uses the Optus D1 satellite.

IPTV
 Vodafone: currently operates a Broadband TV service delivered over fibre, available in Auckland, Wellington and Christchurch, Whangarei, Palmerston North and Dunedin.

Television networks in New Zealand
New Zealand subscription television services